Sarab Khoshkeh-ye Olya (also Romanized as Sarāb Khoshkeh-ye ‘Olyā; also known as Sarāb Khoshkeh-ye Bālā) is a village in Baladarband Rural District, in the Central District of Kermanshah County, Kermanshah Province, Iran. At the 2006 census, its population was 99, in 15 families.

References 

Populated places in Kermanshah County